Amy Morton (born April 3, 1959) is an American actress and director, best known for her work in theatre. Morton was nominated two times for a Tony Award for Best Actress in a Play for her performances in August: Osage County and Who's Afraid of Virginia Woolf?. On screen, she is known for her performances in films Rookie of the Year  (1993), Up in the Air (2009), The Dilemma (2011) and Bluebird (2013). In 2014, Morton began starring as Sergeant Trudy Platt in the NBC drama series Chicago P.D.

Life and career
Morton was born in Oak Park, Illinois, and attended Oak Park and River Forest High School in Oak Park.  She attended both Triton College and Clarke University but did not graduate.

A member of Steppenwolf Theater's core group of actors since 1997, Morton has spent most of her career working in the Chicago theater scene. She has appeared in many stage productions, include Clybourne Park, American Buffalo, Dublin Carol, The Pillowman, Love-Lies-Bleeding and Awake and Sing.

Morton made her Broadway debut as Nurse Ratched, starring opposite Gary Sinise in the Tony Award winning 2001 revival of One Flew Over the Cuckoo's Nest. She originated the role of Barbara in both the original Chicago production and the original Broadway production of Tracy Letts' August: Osage County. For her portrayal she was nominated for both a Tony Award and a Drama Desk Award. Morton reprised the role in the Fall 2008 London production at the National Theatre. Morton received her second Tony Award for Best Actress in a Play nomination for her leading performance in Who's Afraid of Virginia Woolf? (2012–13). In 2015, she made her Off-Broadway directing debut with play Guards at the Taj.

Morton has appeared in a number of films. She made her feature film debut in a supporting role in 1992 comedy, Straight Talk starring Dolly Parton. In 1993 she had main role as mother of the lead character in Rookie of the Year. The film had a box office success, grossing more than $56 million worldwide. Her next screen role was in the 1999 crime thriller 8mm directed by Joel Schumacher. Ten years later, Morton landed her breakthrough role as George Clooney's character's sister in the critically acclaimed drama film Up in the Air directed by Jason Reitman. In 2011 she appeared in the comedy-drama film The Dilemma, and in 2013 had the leading role in the critically acclaimed independent film, Bluebird.

On television, Morton guest starred on Crime Story, The Equalizer, ER, Private Practice, and Homeland. From 2011 to 2012 she had the recurring role of Catherine Walsh, the Republican candidate for governor, in the Starz political drama, Boss. From 2013 to 2014 she had another recurring role as Erin Reagan's new boss, Amanda Harris, on the CBS drama, Blue Bloods. In 2014, Morton was cast in the recurring role as Sergeant Trudy Platt in the NBC dramas Chicago Fire and Chicago P.D. Morton was promoted from recurring guest star to series regular from the second season on Chicago P.D.

Filmography

Film

Television

Awards 
Tony Awards
Nominated – 2008 – Best Actress in a Play – August: Osage County
Nominated – 2013 – Best Actress in a Play – Who's Afraid of Virginia Woolf?

Drama Desk Awards
Nominated – 2008 – Best Actress in a Play – August: Osage County
Nominated – 2013 – Best Actress in a Play – Who's Afraid of Virginia Woolf?

Joseph Jefferson Awards (Chicago, IL)
Nominated – 1984 – Actress in a Principal Role in a Play – Life and Limb (Wisdom Bridge Theatre)
Winner – 1986 – Actress in a Supporting Role in a Play – You Can't Take It with You (Steppenwolf Theatre Company)
Nominated – 1986 – Actress in a Principal Role in a Play – Puntila and his Hired Man (Remains Theatre)
Nominated – 1987 – Actress in a Principal Role in a Play – Higher Standard of Living (Remains Theatre)
Nominated – 1988 – Actress in a Supporting Role in a Play – Big Time (Remains Theatre)
Nominated – 2002 – Director of a Play – Glengarry Glen Ross (Steppenwolf Theatre Company)
Nominated – 2002 – Actress in a Principal Role in a Play – The Royal Family (Steppenwolf Theatre Company)
Nominated – 2003 – Actress in a Principal Role in a Play – Homebody/Kabul (Steppenwolf Theatre Company)
Nominated – 2007 – Actress in a Principal Role in a Play – August: Osage County (Steppenwolf Theatre Company)

Helen Hayes Awards (Washington DC)
Nominated - 2012 - Outstanding Lead Actress, Non-Resident Production - Who's Afraid of Virginia Woolf

References

External links

 Amy Morton at Steppenwolf
 
 

1958 births
20th-century American actresses
21st-century American actresses
Actors from Oak Park, Illinois
Actresses from Illinois
American film actresses
American stage actresses
American television actresses
Living people
Steppenwolf Theatre Company players